Alberch's salamander (Bolitoglossa alberchi) is a species of salamander in the family Plethodontidae. It is endemic to Mexico and known from Veracruz, extreme eastern Oaxaca, and western and central Chiapas, from near sea level to  asl.
Its natural habitats are tropical lowland forests. It also occurs along the edges of clearings and well-shaded plantations. It seems to be a fairly common species, although it is threatened by habitat loss caused by agriculture, wood extraction, and human settlement.

References

Bolitoglossa
Endemic amphibians of Mexico
Amphibians described in 2002
Taxa named by David B. Wake
Taxonomy articles created by Polbot